The Division of Wilmot was an Australian Electoral Division in the state of Tasmania. It was located in central Tasmania, and was named after Sir John Eardley-Wilmot, the sixth Lieutenant-Governor of Tasmania. At various times it included the towns of Deloraine,  Beaconsfield, Devonport, Latrobe, and New Norfolk.

The Division was proclaimed on 2 October 1903, when Tasmania was first divided into Divisions, and was first contested at the 1903 Federal election. At the electoral redistribution of 12 September 1984, it was abolished and replaced by the Division of Lyons, to jointly honour Joseph Lyons, the tenth Prime Minister of Australia, who held Wilmot at the federal level from 1929–1939 and at the state level from 1909 to 1929, and his wife Dame Enid Lyons, the first woman elected to the Australian House of Representatives in 1943 and subsequently the first female member of Cabinet (1949–51).

Members

Election results

Wilmot